T-Mobile Netherlands BV v Raad van bestuur van de Nederlandse Mededingingsautoriteit (2009) C-8/08 is an EU competition law case, concerning the requirements for finding that firms have colluded with the "object" of harming competition.

Facts
T-Mobile phone operators in the Netherlands met once, and discussed reducing the remuneration for dealers of certain phone contracts. It was argued, among other things, that there was no evidence of harm to the final consumer.

Judgment
The Court of Justice held that the phone companies had engaged in an unlawful cartel, and there was no need to show harm to the final consumer.

See also

EU competition law

Notes

References

European Union competition case law
2009 in the European Union
2009 in case law